Aipoceras is a genus of loosely coiled aipoceratid nautiloids with laterally compressed whorls; shells expanding moderately to fairly rapidly with a tendency to uncoil at maturity. Juvenile forms are somewhat cyrtoconic. The apical end forms a hook.  Aipoceras has been found in Lower Mississippian strata in the U.S.

References

 Bernard Kummel, 1964. Nautiloidea - Nautilida; Treatise on Invertebrate Paleontology. Geological Society of America.
Aipoceras in Fossilworks

Prehistoric nautiloid genera
Fossil taxa described in 1884